Choreutis ornaticornis is a moth in the family Choreutidae. It was described by Walsingham in 1900. It is found on Christmas Island.

References

Natural History Museum Lepidoptera generic names catalog

Choreutis
Moths described in 1900